Viitasaari is a town and municipality of Finland.

It is located in the Central Finland region. The town has a population of 
which 
is water. There are all together 230 lakes in Viitasaari. Biggest lakes are Lake Keitele, Lake Kolima and Muuruejärvi. The population density is
.

The municipality is unilingually Finnish.

Politics
Results of the 2011 Finnish parliamentary election in Viitasaari:

 Centre Party   32.5%
 Social Democratic Party   26.2%
 Finns Party   16.6%
 National Coalition Party   9.9%
 Left Alliance   5.5%
 Christian Democrats   5.5%
 Green League   2.6%

Sister cities
The following cities or municipalities are twinned with Viitasaari:
  Nõo Parish, Estonia
  Staffanstorp Municipality, Sweden
  Storuman Municipality, Sweden
  Sør-Odal, Norway
  Schlangen, Germany
  Rokietnica, Poland

See also
 Blue Highway, an international tourist route

References

External links

 Town of Viitasaari – Official website

 
Cities and towns in Finland
Populated places established in 1635
1635 establishments in Sweden